A moon gate is a circular opening in a garden wall that acts as a pedestrian passageway and is a traditional architectural element in Chinese gardens. The gates serve as an inviting entrance into the gardens of the rich upper class in China.

The shape of the gates and their tiles have different spiritual meanings. The sloping roofs of a gate represent the half moon of the Chinese summers, and the tips of the tiles of the roof have talismans on the ends of them.

Moon gates were incorporated into the architecture of Bermuda in the late 19th century, around the same time that the British territory began importing Easter lily bulbs from Japan for cultivation.  Bermudan moon gates are slightly different from the original Chinese designs, as they are often left freestanding or attached to a low wall.  In Bermuda, it is regarded as good luck for newlyweds to step through the gate.

Gallery

References

Architecture in China
Chinese gardening styles
Garden features
Architectural elements